Philip George (born Philip George Woodhead on 13 June 1993) is an English DJ and record producer from Nottingham. Philip George attended a secondary school in Chilwell, Nottingham. He is best known for his 2014 single "Wish You Were Mine", which peaked at number 2 on the UK Singles Chart. A second single featuring Anton Powers entitled "Alone No More" was released on 2 October 2015. The song entered the charts at number 4, becoming George's second top 10 single in the UK.

He had his own show on KISS FM from 12 am to 1 am every Thursday, featuring primarily mixed House beats. The show stopped in 2018.

Career

2010–2014: Liquid drum & bass
Philip George first released music in 2010 under the alias Woody. These tracks first showed up on Dutch label Liquicity. In 2012, MrSuicideSheep's YouTube channel uploaded "Since Then". Around 2014, George started shifting his core genre from liquid drum and bass to house.

2014–present: Breakthrough
On 28 December 2014, George released his debut single "Wish You Were Mine". The song samples the 1969 Stevie Wonder song "My Cherie Amour". On 4 January 2015, the song entered the UK Singles Chart at number two, held off number one by Mark Ronson & Bruno Mars' "Uptown Funk". His second single "Alone No More" was released on 2 October 2015. The song became his second top 5 single in the UK, debuting at number 4.

Discography

Singles

References

Living people
1993 births
Business people from Nottingham
English DJs
English record producers
Electronic dance music DJs